Finland competed at the 2022 World Aquatics Championships in Budapest, Hungary from 17 June to 3 July.

Diving

Finland entered three divers.

Men

Women

Swimming

Finland has entered three swimmers.

Men

Women

References

Nations at the 2022 World Aquatics Championships
Finland at the World Aquatics Championships
2022 in Finnish sport